Sunny Side of Life is a 1985 documentary film about the musical Carter Family focusing on the children of A.P and Sara who still live in the mountains and are trying to keep the legacy of their ancestors alive, at the Carter Fold near Maces Spring, Virginia. It includes interviews with the clan including a small snippet with June Carter Cash. The title is based upon the early Carter Family hit recording, "Keep On the Sunny Side" (1928).

1985 films
American documentary films
Documentary films about singers
Documentary films about families
Documentary films about country music and musicians
1980s American films